Knautia is a genus of flowering plants in the family Caprifoliaceae. The common names are variants of "widow flower".  Others are given the name "scabious", which properly belongs to the related genus (Scabiosa). The name Knautia comes from the 17th-century German botanists, Drs. Christoph and Christian Knaut.

Selected species
 Knautia arvensis - Meadow widow flower, blue buttons, field scabious
 Knautia carinthiaca
 Knautia drymeia - Hungarian widow flower
 Knautia kitaibelii
 Knautia longifolia - Long leaf widow flower
 Knautia macedonica - Macedonian scabious
 Knautia maxima - Forest widow flower
 Knautia norica
 Knautia persicina

References

Caprifoliaceae genera
Taxa named by Carl Linnaeus